Dasychira grisefacta, the pine tussock or grizzled tussock, is a moth of the family Erebidae. The species was first described by Harrison Gray Dyar Jr. in 1911. It is found in North America in Alberta, from British Columbia to Arizona and Oregon, in New Mexico, Montana, South Dakota and North Dakota.

The wingspan is about 42 mm for males, the females are wingless.

The larvae feed on Pseudotsuga menziesii, Tsuga heterophylla, Picea engelmannii, Picea glauca, Pinus ponderosa  and Pinus edulis.

Subspecies
There are two recognized subspecies:
Dasychira grisefacta grisefacta (Dyar, 1911)
Dasychira grisefacta ella (Bryk, 1934)

References

Miller, Jeffrey C. & Hammond, Paul C. (2000). "Macromoths of Northwest Forests and Woodlands". U.S. Department of Agriculture, Forest Service, Forest Health Technology Enterprise Team.

Lymantriinae
Moths of North America
Moths described in 1911